"Waiting on a War" is a song by American rock band Foo Fighters. It was released as the third single off of their tenth album Medicine at Midnight.

Background
The song was first released on January 14, 2021, as the third single from their tenth studio album, Medicine at Midnight, after "Shame Shame" and "No Son of Mine". The date was chosen to celebrate frontman Dave Grohl's 52nd birthday. The band debuted the song live on Jimmy Kimmel Live! on the same date.

Themes and composition
Lyrically, the song was described as the Foo Fighters' modern approach to a "Give Peace a Chance" type song, with Grohl pondering the possibility of a dark future. The lyrical content was inspired by bleak conversation Grohl had had with his own daughter Harper Grohl, in 2019, which reminded him of his own worries about the world:  Grohl later explained that he himself had feared the effect of the Cold War while growing up in Washington DC. Upon the completion of the song, Grohl felt it was one of the best songs the band had ever written.

The song was described as an "acoustic-driven tune" and "aching ballad" that "explodes with rock fury in the home stretch". Most of the song is composed primarily of Grohl singing over an acoustic guitar, bass, and drums, and strings, before building in intensity in its second half, and moving into an energetic, full-band rock sound with electric guitars for the last minute. The song was noted to have a more traditional Foo Fighters sound than prior singles from the album.

Music video
A music video directed by Paola Kudacki was released for the song on January 19, 2021. It features the band performing mixed with cinematic shots of young people whose carefree outlook on life is threatened by ominous-looking adults who have brown paper bags over their heads.

Reception
Rolling Stone singled the song out as the standout track on Medicine at Midnight.

Personnel
Foo Fighters
 Dave Grohl – lead vocals, acoustic guitar
 Taylor Hawkins – drums
 Rami Jaffee – keyboards
 Nate Mendel – bass guitar
 Chris Shiflett – guitar
 Pat Smear – guitar

Production

 Greg Kurstin – producer

Charts

Weekly charts

Year-end charts

Awards

References

2020 songs
2021 singles
Foo Fighters songs
Grammy Award for Best Rock Song
RCA Records singles
Song recordings produced by Greg Kurstin
Songs written by Dave Grohl
Songs written by Nate Mendel
Songs written by Pat Smear
Songs written by Taylor Hawkins
Songs written by Chris Shiflett